Tommaso is an Italian given name. It has also been used as a surname. Notable people with the name include:

Given name

A
 Tommaso Acquaviva d'Aragona (1600–1672), Roman Catholic prelate
 Tommaso Aldrovandini (1653–1736), Italian painter of the Baroque period
 Tommaso de Aleni (16th century), Italian painter of the Renaissance period
 Tommaso Allan, Italian rugby union player
 Tommaso Amantini (1625–1675), Italian sculptor and painter of the Baroque period
 Tommaso Ammirato (died 1438), Roman Catholic prelate
 Tommaso d'Ancora (1583–1656), Roman Catholic prelate
 Tommaso d'Aquino (disambiguation), multiple people
 Tommaso Arrigoni (born 1994), Italian football midfielder
 Tommaso Audisio (1789–1845), Italian priest and architect
 Tommaso D'Avalos (1610–1642) was a Roman Catholic prelate

B
 Tommaso Badia (1483–1547), Italian Dominican cardinal
 Tommaso Balestrieri (18th century), Italian luthier
 Tommaso Barnabei (c. 1500–1559), Italian painter
 Tommaso Bellazzini (born 1987), Italian footballer
 Tommaso Benedetti (1797–1863), English-born Austrian painter of Italian descent
 Tommaso Benvenuti (rugby union) (born 1990), Italian rugby union player
 Tommaso Berni (born 1983), Italian football goalkeeper
 Tommaso Besozzi (1903–1964), Italian journalist and writer
 Tommaso Bianchi (born 1988), Italian football midfielder
 Tommaso Bisagno (1935–2014), Italian academic and politician
 Tommaso Pio Boggiani (1863–1942), Cardinal of the Roman Catholic Church
 Tommaso Boggio (1877–1963), Italian mathematician
 Tommaso Bona (16th century), Italian painter of the Renaissance period
 Tommaso Boni (born 1993), Italian rugby union player
 Tommaso Brancaccio (1621–1677), Roman Catholic prelate
 Tommaso Buscetta (1928–2000), Sicilian mafioso

C
 Tommaso Caccini (1574–1648), Italian Dominican friar and preacher
 Tommaso Campailla (1668–1740), Italian philosopher, doctor, politician, poet and teacher
 Tommaso Campana (fl. 1620–1640), Italian painter active during the Baroque
 Tommaso Campanella (1568–1639), Dominican friar
 Tommaso Cancelloni (born 1992), Italian football defender
 Tommaso Cancellotti (born 1992), Italian football defender
 Tommaso Caputo (born 1950), Italian Catholic Bishop and Diplomat
 Tommaso Caracciolo (1572–1631), Field Marshal who commanded parts of the Spanish forces
 Tommaso Caracciolo (disambiguation), multiple people
 Tommaso Carafa (1588–1664), Roman Catholic prelate
 Tommaso Carletti (1860–1919), Governor of Italian Somalia
 Tommaso Cascella (1890–1968), Italian painter, known for brightly colored landscapes
 Tommaso Caudera (born 1907), Italian footballer
 Tommaso dei Cavalieri (1509–1587), Italian nobleman
 Tommaso Cazzaniga (born 1998), Italian football player
 Tommaso Ceccarelli (born 1992), Italian footballer
 Tommaso Ceva (1648–1737), Italian Jesuit mathematician
 Tommaso Chiecchi (born 1979), Italian football defender
 Tommaso Chieffi (born 1961), Italian yacht racer
 Tommaso Ciampa (born 1985), American professional wrestler
 Tommaso Coletti (born 1984), Italian football midfielder
 Tommaso Colombaretti (born 1980), Italian football defender
 Tommaso Conca (1734–1822), Italian painter and draftsman
 Tommaso Condulmier (1759–1823), Italian noble and admiral
 Tommaso da Cori (1655–1729), Italian Roman Catholic priest
 Tommaso Corsini (1835–1919), Italian politician who was mayor of Florence
 Tommaso Costa (1634–1690), Italian painter of the Baroque period
 Tommaso Costanzi (1700–1747), Italian gem engraver of the late-Baroque period
 Tommaso Costantino (1885–1950), Italian fencer
 Tommaso Crudeli (1702–1745), Florentine free thinker

D
 Tommaso D'Apice (born 1988), Italian rugby union footballer
 Tommaso D'Attoma (born 1988), Italian footballer
 Tommaso Debenedetti (born 1969), Italian journalist and author
 Tommaso Dingli (1591–1666), Maltese architect and sculptor
 Tommaso Diplovataccio (1468–1541), Greco-Italian jurist, publisher and politician
 Tommaso Dolabella (1570–1650), Baroque Italian painter from Venice
 Tommaso Domini (born 1989), Italian football midfielder
 Tommaso D'Orsogna (born 1990), Australian freestyle swimmer
 Tommaso Dossi (1678–1730), Italian painter of the late-Baroque period
 Tommaso Dotti (born 1993), Italian male short track speed skater

F
 Tommaso Fazello (1498–1570), Italian Dominican friar, historian and antiquarian
 Tommaso Maria Fusco (1831–1891), Italian Roman Catholic priest

G
 Tommaso Gabrielli (born 1992), Italian motorcycle racer
 Tommaso Gaffi (1667–1744), Italian baroque composer
 Tommaso del Garbo (c. 1305–1370), professor of medicine in Perugia and Bologna
 Tommaso Gasparotti (1785–1847), Italian poet, painter, paleographist and bibibliophile archivist
 Tommaso Gazzarini (1790–1853), Italian painter who painted religious and historic subjects
 Tommaso Geraci (born 1931), Italian sculptor
 Tommaso Gherardini (1715–1797), Italian painter of Rococo fresco decorations
 Tommaso Ghinassi (born 1987), Italian football defender
 Tommaso Ghirardi (born 1975), Italian businessman
 Tommaso Giordani, Italian composer active in England and Ireland
 Tommaso Pasquale Gizzi (1787–1849), Italian prelate
 Tommaso Goi (born 1990), Italian ice hockey player
 Tommaso Grossi (1791–1853), Italian poet and novelist
 Tommaso Guzzoni (1632–1704), Roman Catholic prelate

I
 Tommaso Iannone (born 1990), Italian rugby union player
 Tommaso Imperato (1596–1656), Roman Catholic prelate
 Tommaso Inghirami (1470–1516), Renaissance humanist and a deacon of the Catholic Church

J
 Tommaso Juglaris (1844–1925), Italian painter

L
 Tommaso Labranca (1962–2016), Italian essayist, novelist, journalist, writer, and radio presenter
 Tommaso Lancisi (1603–1682), Italian painter, active in a Baroque style
 Tommaso Landolfi (1908–1979), Italian author, translator and literary critic
 Tommaso Laureti (c. 1530—1602), Italian painter
 Tommaso Leoni (born 1991), Italian snowboarder, specializing in snowboard cross
 Tommaso Lequio di Assaba (1893–1965), Italian horse rider
 Tommaso Lomonaco (1901–1992), Italian aeronautical scientist
 Tommaso Lorenzetti (born 1985), Italian motorcycle racer
 Tommaso Luini, Italian painter of the Baroque period

M
 Tommaso Maestrelli (1922–1976), Italian football midfielder and manager
 Tommaso Malombra (died 1513), Roman Catholic prelate
 Tommaso Malvito (died 1524), Italian sculptor
 Tommaso Marchesi (1773–1852), Italian composer
 Tommaso Marconi (born 1982), Italian diver
 Tommaso Marolda (born 1981), Italian footballer
 Tommaso Martinelli (1827–1888), Cardinal of the Roman Catholic Church
 Tommaso Martini (1688–1755), Italian painter of the late-Baroque period
 Tommaso Mattei (17th century), Italian architect
 Tommaso del Mazza (fl. 1377–1392), Italian painter
 Tommaso de Mezzo (born c. 1447), Venetian noble and playwright
 Tommaso Minardi (1787–1871), Italian painter and author
 Tommaso Misciroli (1636–1699), Italian painter of the Baroque period
 Tommaso Mocenigo (1343–1423), doge of Venice
 Tommaso da Modena (1326–1379), Italian painter
 Tommaso Montano (born 1953), Italian fencer
 Tommaso Morganti (died 1419), Roman Catholic prelate
 Tommaso Morlino (1925–1983), Italian Christian Democrat politician

N
 Tommaso Napoli (1659–1725), Italian architect, Dominican Order monk, engineer and mathematician
 Tommaso Nardini (1658–1718), Italian priest and painter of the Baroque period
 Tommaso Neri (born 2001), Italian actor

O
 Tommaso degli Obizzi (1750–1803), Italian art collector
 Tommaso d'Ocra (died 1300), Italian monk and Roman Catholic Cardinal
 Tommaso da Olera (1563–1631), Roman Catholic Italian professed religious from the Order of Friars Minor Capuchin
 Tommaso Orsini (died 1576), Roman Catholic prelate
 Tommaso Oxilia (born 1998), Italian basketball player

P
 Tommaso Padoa-Schioppa (1940–2010), Italian banker and economist
 Tommaso Palamidessi (1915–1983), Italian esotericist
 Tommaso Perelli (1704–1783), Italian astronomer
 Tommaso di Piero (1464–1529), Italian painter
 Tommaso Pincio, Italian author
 Tommaso Pollace (1748–1830), Italian painter
 Tommaso Portinari (died 1501), Italian banker for the Medici bank
 Tommaso Dal Pozzo (1862–1906), Italian painter and ceramist
 Tommaso de Pra (born 1938), Italian road bicycle race
 Tommaso Puccini (1749-1811), Italian art historian

R
 Tommaso Raggio (1531—1599), Jesuit missionary
 Tommaso Realfonso (18th century), Italian painter
 Tommaso Reato (born 1984), Italian rugby union player
 Tommaso Redi (1665–1726), Italian painter
 Tommaso Reggio (1818–1901), Italian Roman Catholic prelate
 Tommaso Riario Sforza (1782–1857), Neapolitan Cardinal
 Tommaso Riccardi (1844–1915), Italian Roman Catholic priest
 Tommaso Righi (1727–1802), Italian sculptor and stuccator
 Tommaso Rinaldi (born 1991), Italian diver
 Tommaso Rinuccini (1596–1682), Italian noble and diplomat
 Tommaso Rocchi (born 1977), Italian footballer
 Tommaso Romito (born 1982), Italian footballer
 Tommaso de Rosa (1621–1695), Roman Catholic prelate
 Tommaso Ruffo (1663–1753), Italian archbishop of Ferrara and Cardinal

S
 Tommaso Salini (1575–1625), Italian painter of the early-Baroque period
 Tommaso Salvadori (1835–1923), Italian zoologist and ornithologist
 Tommaso Salvini (1829–1915), Italian actor
 Tommaso da San Cipriano (fl. 1519–1527), Roman Catholic prelate
 Tommaso Sandrini (1575–1631), Italian painter, active in painting quadratura in Northern Italy
 Tommaso Sandrino (1575–1630), Italian painter
 Tommaso de Sarria (1606–1682), Roman Catholic prelate
 Tommaso Scotti (died 1566), Roman Catholic prelate
 Tommaso Scuffia (born 1991), Italian football goalkeeper
 Tommaso di Sicilia (died 1526), Roman Catholic prelate
 Tommaso Ugi di Siena (14th-century), Italian adventurer
 Tommaso Silvestri (born 1991), Italian footballer
 Tommaso Solari (1820–1889), Italian sculptor active in a Romantic-style
 Tommaso Sperandio Corbelli (died 1590), Roman Catholic prelate
 Tommaso de Stefani (c. 1250–c. 1310), Italian painter of the Renaissance period
 Tommaso degli Stefani (1231–1310), Italian artist, working in Naples
 Tommaso Stella (died 1566), Roman Catholic prelate
 Tommaso Struzzieri (1706–1780), Roman Catholic prelate

T
 Tommaso Tamburini (1591–1675), Italian Jesuit moral theologian
 Tommaso Temanza (1705–1789), Italian architect and author
 Tommaso Tittoni (1855–1931), Italian diplomat, politician and Knight of the Annunziata
 Tommaso Toffoli, professor of electrical and computer engineering
 Tommaso Tommasina (1855–1935), Italian painter and sculptor
 Tommaso Traetta (1727–1779), Italian composer
 Tommaso Traversa (born 1990), Italian ice hockey player
 Tommaso Turco (died 1649), Master of the Order of Preachers

V
 Tommaso Vailatti (born 1986), Italian footballer
 Tommaso Valletti, Italian professor of economics
 Tommaso de Vigilia (fl. 1480–1497), Italian painter of the Renaissance period
 Tommaso Vincidor  (1493–1536), Italian Renaissance painter and architect
 Tommaso De Vivo (1787–1884), Italian painter active mainly in Naples

X
 Tommaso Ximenes (died 1633), Roman Catholic prelate who served as Bishop of Fiesole

Z
 Tommaso Zafferani (born 1996), Sammarinese footballer
 Tommaso Ziffer, Italian architect and interior designer
 Tommaso Maria Zigliara (1833–1893),  Roman Catholic priest of the Dominican Order

Surname
 Bruno Tommaso (born 1946), Italian jazz double-bass player and composer
 Niccolò di Tommaso (active 1346–1376), Italian painter
 Tony de Tommaso (born 1951), Italian racing driver

See also
 Tomaso
 Masotti, surname derived from Tommaso
 Di Tommaso, surname

Italian masculine given names